Pertusaria sipmanii is a species of crustose lichen in the family Pertusariaceae. Found in Papua New Guinea, it was formally described as a new species in 1998 by  Alan Archer and John Elix. The species epithet sipmanii honours Dutch lichenologist Harrie Sipman, who collected the type specimen.

See also
 List of Pertusaria species

References

sipmanii
Lichen species
Lichens described in 1993
Lichens of New Guinea
Taxa named by Alan W. Archer
Taxa named by John Alan Elix